Tiger Woods PGA Tour 06 is a sports video game developed by EA Redwood Shores for the GameCube, PlayStation 2, Xbox and Xbox 360 versions, Headgate Studios for the Microsoft Windows version, and Team Fusion for the PlayStation Portable version, and published by EA Sports for GameCube, Microsoft Windows, PlayStation 2, Xbox, PlayStation Portable, and Xbox 360.

Gameplay
The game features several types of play, including the development of golfers in a simulated PGA Tour environment. Among other things, the game also features a set of famous courses and players. Also it includes the Stroke Play, Match Play, and Skins Play among other numerous methods of play. It also includes the Four Ball, Best Ball, and Stableford modes of play.

By being able to customize golfers and advancing that character through several stages (from amateur to pro) the game allows a high level of identification with the character. The virtual ego can be equipped with various pieces of equipment and styled according to the wishes of the player. The custom outfits are licensed and include several brands which are commonly present in professional golf, among others: Nike, Adidas, Callaway, Ping, Taylormade, etc.

Reception

Tiger Woods PGA Tour 06 received "generally favorable" reviews on all platforms except the Xbox 360 version, which received "mixed or average" reviews, according to video game review aggregator Metacritic.

PGA Tour 06 won PC Gamer USs "Best Sports Game 2005" award. The magazine's Chuck Osborn wrote that the series "just keeps getting better and better with each yearly update."

Notes

References

External links
 

2005 video games
EA Sports games
GameCube games
Golf video games
PlayStation 2 games
PlayStation Portable games
Sports video games set in the United States
Tiger Woods video games
Video games developed in the United States
Video games set in the United Kingdom
Windows games
Xbox games
Xbox 360 games